Helen Wood (1917-1988) was an American actress active in film and radio primarily during the 1930s.  She is not to be confused with the actress and performer Helen [Ann] Wood (1935-1998), who later appeared in Deep Throat and other adult films as "Dolly Sharp."

Biography 
Wood was born in Clarksville, Tennessee, to Edwin Wood (who worked in real estate and insurance) and Hazel Case. She had a younger sister, Mary Martha.

After winning a beauty contest at Clarksville's Capitol Theatre in 1933 as a teenager, Wood earned a trip to Hollywood, where she was cast in Roman Scandals (1933). She then returned to Clarksville to finish high school; upon her return to Hollywood after graduation, she signed a contract with MGM.

She reportedly spent $4,000 on a vocal coach who helped her drop her Southern accent. She later signed at 20th Century Fox, where she was made to compete for parts against fellow actresses Rita Hayworth (then Margarita Cansino) and Dixie Dunbar. On-screen, she was frequently paired with actor Thomas Beck. Supposedly she had to back out of a big role due to an illness early on in her career.

She worked in radio after her on-screen roles dried up in the late 1930s. In 1942, she married Earl Henriksen.

Selected filmography 
 Roman Scandals (1933)
 Moulin Rouge (1934)
 Kid Millions (1934)
 Gold Diggers of 1935 (1935)
 Mary Jane's Pa (1935)
 In Caliente (1935)
 Anna Karenina (1935)
 She Married Her Boss (1935)
 The Goose and the Gander (1935)
 A Midsummer Night's Dream (1935)
 My Marriage (1936)
 Champagne Charlie (1936)
 High Tension (1936)
 Charlie Chan at the Race Track (1936)
 Sing, Baby, Sing (1936)
 Can This Be Dixie? (1936)
 Crack-Up (1936)
 Almost a Gentleman (1939)
 Sorority House (1939)
 The Pilgrimage Play (1949)

References

External Links 
 Entry for Helen Wood (1) (1917-1988) at the Internet Movie Database: https://www.imdb.com/name/nm0789032/
 

American film actresses
American radio actresses
Actresses from Tennessee
People from Clarksville, Tennessee
1917 births
1987 deaths
20th-century American actresses